The University of Hawaii at Hilo Botanical Gardens are botanical gardens on the University of Hawaii at Hilo campus, located at  470 W Lanikaula St, Hilo, Hawaii on the island of Hawaii. They are open daily without charge.

The gardens were established by UH-Hilo professor Don Hemmes at some time in the 1980s, after a student said that they had never seen a pine tree before.

The gardens contain one of Hawaii's best cycad collections, with nearly a hundred species from Africa, China, North and Central America, and Australia. It also contains an international collection of palm trees, and almost all species of Hawaiian Pritchardia. Since the gardens are located in a windward area of the university campus, they get a substantial amount of rain.

References

See also
 List of botanical gardens in the United States

Education in Hawaii County, Hawaii
Botanical gardens in Hawaii
Protected areas of Hawaii (island)
Hilo, Hawaii
1980s establishments in Hawaii